Time Travel is the third  studio album by Never Shout Never. It was released on September 20, 2011. It was recorded in Springfield, Missouri. It is also the first album in which Never Shout Never recorded as a full band.

Background
"Time Travel" was released as the first single on July 22, 2011. The music video was released on September 21, 2011. The second single "Simplistic Trance - Like Getaway" was released on August 26, 2011. Before the albums arrival, "Silver Ecstasy" was released as a promotional single on September 13, 2011. On the day of the albums release, they announced a fall headliner tour called, "The Time Travel Tour".

Critical reception

Gregory Heaney of AllMusic gave the album a 3 star rating. He complimented the album for having a "real sense of atmosphere, and showcase the transformative powers of collaboration." However, he critic the album as, "downright psychedelic" by emo standards.

Track listing

Personnel
Credits for Time Travel adapted from AllMusic.

Never Shout Never
Christofer Drew Ingle – Lead vocals, rhythm guitar, keyboards, piano, ukulele, programming, banjo, harmonica, creative director
Caleb Denison – Drums, percussion, backing vocals, guitars 
Taylor MacFee – bass, backing vocals
Hayden Kaiser – Lead guitar, backing vocals, percussion

Production
David Beame – Legal advisor
David Conway – Management
Bradley Edwards – Artwork
Dirk Hemsath – Management
Daniel Hersch – Mastering
Frank Maddocks – Creative director
Xavier Ramos –  Marketing
Jeff Smith – Engineering, mixing
Stephan Walker – Art direction, design

Charts

Release history

References

2011 albums
Never Shout Never albums
Sire Records albums
Warner Records albums
Reprise Records albums